Daniel Joseph Patrick Callahan (19 February 1898 – 24 May 1978) was an Australian rules footballer who played with Essendon in the Victorian Football League (VFL).

Notes

External links 

1898 births
1978 deaths
Australian rules footballers from Victoria (Australia)
Essendon Football Club players
Footscray Football Club (VFA) players